The 2021 Louisiana Tech Bulldogs football team represented Louisiana Tech University in the 2021 NCAA Division I FBS football season. The Bulldogs played their home games at Joe Aillet Stadium in Ruston, Louisiana, and competed in the West Division of Conference USA (C-USA). They were led by ninth-year head coach Skip Holtz.

Schedule

References

Louisiana Tech
Louisiana Tech Bulldogs football seasons
Louisiana Tech Bulldogs football